A major bushfire occurred in southern Queensland, Australia, in October 1993, and several major bushfires occurred in New South Wales from December 1993 to January 1994. 3 people were killed in New South Wales by the fires and more than 29 were injured. More than 70,000 ha were destroyed in New South Wales.

References

Bushfire seasons in Australia
Bush 
Bush
1993 in Australia
1994 in Australia
1990s wildfires
1993 in the environment 
1994 in the environment
Bush
Bush